James Troupe (December 4, 1909 - January 26, 1994) was a state legislator in Missouri. He served in the Missouri House of Representatives from 1954 to 1960 and from 1962 to 1972. He was born in Dublin, Georgia. A Democrat, he represented St. Louis. He married Gertrude Thompson.

See also
List of African-American officeholders (1900–1959)

References

Members of the Missouri House of Representatives
1909 births

1994 deaths